The Rural Municipality of Sasman No. 336 is a rural municipality (RM) in the Canadian province of Saskatchewan within Census Division No. 10 and  Division No. 4.

History 
The RM of Sasman No. 336 incorporated as a rural municipality on January 1, 1913. The RM's name is a portmanteau of Saskatchewan and Manitoba.

Geography

Communities and localities 
The following urban municipalities are surrounded by the RM.

Villages
 Margo

The following unincorporated communities are within the RM.

Organized hamlets
 Kuroki
 North Shore Fishing Lake
 Ottman-Murray Beach

Localities
 Kylemore
 Nut Mountain

Demographics 

Attractions 
 Margo Provincial Recreation Site
 Fishing Lake Regional Park
Saskatchewan Beach
Leslie Beach
 Beach

Government 
The RM of Sasman No. 336 is governed by an elected municipal council and an appointed administrator that meets on the second Tuesday of every month. The reeve of the RM is Dwayne Nakrayko while its administrator is Michael Rattray. The RM's office is located in Kuroki.

Transportation 
 Saskatchewan Highway 5
 Saskatchewan Highway 38
 Saskatchewan Highway 49
 Saskatchewan Highway 665
 Saskatchewan Highway 755
 Kelvington Airport

See also 
 List of rural municipalities in Saskatchewan
 List of geographic names derived from portmanteaus

References

Sasman

Division No. 10, Saskatchewan